Dona Drake (born Eunice Westmoreland; November 15, 1914 – June 20, 1989) was an American singer, dancer and film actress in the 1930s and 1940s. Drake was mixed race by ancestry.  She often presented herself as Mexican and went by the names Una Novella and Rita Novella, typically being cast in "ethnic" white roles including Latin American and Middle Easterners. As Mexican "Rita Rio", she led a touring all-girl orchestra in the early 1940s, also known as "Dona Drake and her Girl Band", among other names for her musical and dance acts.

Early life
Drake was born Eunice Westmoreland in Miami, Florida in 1914, one of five children of Joseph Westmoreland and his wife, Novella (née Smith). U.S. Census reports on her family history identify her grandparents as one black couple and one couple that was black/white.

Career
Entering show business in the 1930s, she used the names Una Velon (or Una Villon), Rita Rio and Rita Shaw.

Una Villon
She began performing in 1932, working under the name Una Villon as a chorus girl and in nightclubs. As Una Villon, she appeared in Earl Carroll's Vanities in 1933, prompting Paul Harrison to write in a review printed in The Indiana Gazette: "Most noteworthy newcomer is Miss Una Villon who sings, dances and looks like a 16-year-old incarnation of Ann Pennington. Only a couple of days before the premiere she was hired away from a Broadway night club and already has proved her right to a place in the big-time spotlight."

In 1934, columnist Walter Winchell wrote about her performance in a night club: "Una Villon's torso shifting serves to synchronize the tempos instead of Berren's directing — this young lady directs the tooters with her wiggling."

Rita Rio and Rita Shaw
She began using the name Rita Rio in 1935, when she was featured at the Paradise cabaret on Broadway. Besides singing and dancing, she sometimes played piano, trumpet, clarinet, saxophone and drums and occasionally led the orchestra. In 1936, she and another woman formed an orchestra. After the group had financial problems in 1940, she went to Hollywood, where she had screen tests using the name Rita Shaw.

She settled on the stage name Dona Drake in the early 1940s. Studio publicity during her heyday incorrectly stated that Drake was of Mexican origin and was born Rita Novella (borrowing her mother's first name as a new last).

Her striking, angular features and dark curly hair led her to being cast as an ethnic character, such as a Latina, Middle Easterner, American Indian, or Gypsy. She is perhaps best known for playing the American Indian maid of Bette Davis in Beyond the Forest. She also appeared as the Arab girl Mihirmah, opposite Bob Hope and Bing Crosby in Road to Morocco in 1942. In 1944 she appeared as a lead role as a big band singer in a B-movie titled Hot Rhythm, which also featured Irene Ryan (Granny from The Beverly Hillbillies) as a ditsy secretary.

Drake had a notable "non-ethnic", non-musical role as the second female lead in the 1949 comedy The Girl from Jones Beach, playing opposite Eddie Bracken. The year before, she gave a memorable comic performance as the fortune-hunting sister in So This Is New York.

In the early 1940s, Drake toured the United States with an all-girl orchestra called "The Girl Friends", which included fellow Hollywood actresses Marie Wilson, Toby Wing, and Faith Bacon.

Personal life
In 1936, Drake was questioned by the FBI about the murder of her then-boyfriend and known mobster, Louis Amberg. She claimed to only know him as "Mr. Cohen" and had no idea what he did for a living.

Drake married Oscar and Emmy award-winning fashion designer William Travilla on August 19, 1944. They had one daughter, Nia (August 16, 1951 – October 1, 2002), and remained a couple until her death. Travilla appeared on the March 24, 1960, episode of You Bet Your Life, hosted by Groucho Marx, and introduced his elegantly dressed wife to the audience.

Drake died of pneumonia and respiratory failure in Los Angeles, California on June 20, 1989, at the age of 74. She was cremated and her ashes scattered at sea.

Filmography

References

External links

 
 
 
 

American film actresses
American female dancers
Dancers from Florida
1914 births
1989 deaths
20th-century American actresses
20th-century American singers
20th-century American women singers
20th-century American dancers